RGP, formerly known as Skull & Haha, is a South Korean duo formed by Quan Entertainment in Seoul, South Korea. They debuted on July 30, 2012, with Ya Man!!.

Discography

Album

Extended plays

Singles

Collaborations

Soundtrack Appearances

Filmography

Television Appearances

Concerts and shows

Concert participation

References

External links 

 Official Website

Musical groups from Seoul
Musical groups established in 2012
2012 establishments in South Korea
South Korean musical duos